Qassam is an acronym for the Arabic Quwat al-islamiya al-mujahida (Islamic combatant force), meaning the armed branch of an Islamic movement.

It may refer to:
Izz ad-Din al-Qassam, an influential Islamist preacher
Izz ad-Din al-Qassam Brigades, the military wing of Hamas
Qassam rocket, a type of rocket used by the military wing of Hamas against Israel

See also 
 Qasam (disambiguation)